The Agger is a river in Germany, a right tributary of the Sieg in North Rhine-Westphalia. Its source is in the Sauerland hills, near Meinerzhagen. It winds through the towns Engelskirchen, Overath and Lohmar. Near Siegburg the Agger flows into the Sieg.

Tributaries

The following rivers are tributaries to the river Agger (from source to mouth):

Left: Rengse, Dörspe, Steinagger, Halstenbach, Wiehl, Kaltenbach, Loopebach, Schlingenbach, Lombach, Hohner Bach, Naafbach, Jabach, Auelsbach, Rothenbach

Right: Genkel, Seßmarbach, Rospebach, Strombach, Loper Bach, Walbach, Leppe, Oberscheider Bach, Sülz

See also
 List of rivers of North Rhine-Westphalia

References

Rivers of North Rhine-Westphalia
Rivers of Germany